Ornipholidotos sylpha is a butterfly in the family Lycaenidae. It is found in Cameroon and the Republic of the Congo. The habitat consists of forests.

References

Butterflies described in 1890
Ornipholidotos
Butterflies of Africa